Silver Medallion (foaled  May 1st, 2008) is an American Thoroughbred racehorse and the winner of the 2011 Tropical Turf Handicap.

Career

Silver Medallion's first race was on August 4, 2010, at Saratoga, where he came in first. He picked up his next win on December 31, 2010, by winning the Eddie Logan Stakes.

Silver Medallion started off the 2011 year with a February 12th, 2011 victory at the El Camino Real Derby. In April, he competed in the 2011 Santa Anita Derby, but placed in 4th.

It took him 3 more races before he picked up another win at his last race of the year - the 2011 Tropical Turf Handicap in December. 

Silver Medallion followed his victory up win a win the following month at the 2012 Fort Lauderdale Stakes.

His final race was at the February 11th, 2012 Gulfstream Park Turf Handicap, where he finished in 7th.

Silver Medallion was injured during training and was retired in May 2012.

Pedigree

References

2008 racehorse births